The Surrender of Fadak, also spelt Fidak, or Fidk took place in May 628AD, 2nd month of 7AH of the Islamic calendar.

The Islamic prophet Muhammad had found out that the People of Fadak had collected in order to fight the Muslims alongside the Khaybar Jews. Therefore, he sent Ali to them.

The people of Fadak surrendered without a fight, and pleaded for a peace treaty in exchange for giving away half their land and wealth to Mohammed.

Fadak became Muhammad’s private property (a Fai), as there was no Muslim fighters involved in Fadak to share the booty with. Muhammad gave the wealth away to orphans and also used it to finance the marriage of needy young men.

The Conquest of Fadak
During the time of negotiation with the Khaybar Jews, Muhammad sent Mahsia bin Masood, to send a message to the Jews of Fadak, asking them to surrender their properties and wealth or be attacked like Khaybar.

When the people of Fadak had heard of what happened to the Khaybar Jews, they were panic stricken. To spare their lives, they pleaded for a peace treaty, and in exchange requested Muhammad to take over one half of their wealth and property and banish them.

After the Khaybar Jews surrendered to Muhammad and, having lost their only source of livelihood, they requested him to employ them back on their properties for half the share of the crop. Muhammad found it much more convenient to re-employ them, as the Jews were already very experienced with their land, whereas the Muslims (the new occupiers of their land) had no experience with agriculture and cultivation. So Muhammad made some conciliation to the Khaybar Jews by re-engaging them in their lost land, but on condition that he reserved the right to banish them any time he wished. The Jews had very little choice but to agree. The same terms were applied to the Fadak Jews.

Fadak became Muhammad’s private property (a Fai), as there was no Muslim fighters involved in Fadak to share the booty with. Mohammed gave the wealth away to orphans and financed the marriage of needy young men.

The Quran verse 59:6 and 59:7 is also related to this event.

Umar expels the Inhabitants
Later, when Umar became the Caliph of Islam, he expelled all the Jews from Kahybar and Fadak. He sent Abul Haitham Malik ibn al Taiyihan to justly work out the value of the land they own (they owned half the land), and gave back half of the value of the soil.

Islamic primary sources

The Quran verse 59:6 and 59:7 is related to this event, it states the rules about Mohammeds private property (fai):

The famous Muslim scholar Ibn Kathir's commentary (tafsir) of the verse is as follows:

The event is also mentioned in the Sunni Hadith collection, Sahih Muslim as follows:

See also
 Muhammad as a general

Notes

628
Campaigns led by Muhammad